GOST 7.67 is GOST standard for country codes and codes of Russian federal subjects (regions).

The standard defines country names in Russian and English language, Cyrillic three-letter country codes, Latin three- and two-letter country codes, as well as numeric country codes. The latter three are the same as ISO 3166 codes (though, in practice, differences can arise due to changes in ISO 3166 that are still not introduced in GOST 7.67, for example three-letter code for Romania ROM, which is changed to ROU).

In 2005 new edition GOST 7.67-2003 was released. The updated GOST was based on ISO 3166-1:1997 standard and replaced the earlier version GOST 7.67-1994. It was approved by the CIS members and entered into force as CIS international standard МКС 01.140.20. The new standard incorporates the changes that happened before 2003 and also lists Russian, Belarusian, Tajik and Kazakh regions and their codes. Part of the Russian regions are coded with two-letter codes, the universal is, however, three-letter regional coding. The codes for certain Russian regions in GOST 7.67 differ from ISO 3166-2:RU regional codes, for example RU-SPB vs. RU-SPE respectively for Saint-Petersburg.

GOST 7.67-94 Country codes

GOST 7.67-2003 Country Codes (common for CIS countries)

Regional Codes of Russia as per GOST  7.67-2003 

Two-letter regional codes are available only for Moscow, Saint-Petersburg and federal subjects with republican status.

References

Sources
Коды названий стран, at the official website of the TGTU.

GOST standards
Country codes